Montjoie may refer to:

Places

France
 Montjoie-le-Château, a commune in Doubs
 Montjoie-Saint-Martin, a commune in Manche
 Montjoie-en-Couserans, a commune in Ariège
 Saint-Michel-de-Montjoie, a commune in Manche
 Les Contamines-Montjoie, a commune in Haute-Savoie

Germany
 Montjoie, alternate name for Monschau (North Rhine-Westphalia)

Palestine
 Montjoie, the mountain close to modern Nabi Samwil from which the Crusaders first could see Jerusalem

Other
 Order of Montjoie, a military order during the Crusades.
 Montjoie, a French battle standard known as an oriflamme.
 Montjoie Saint Denis!, the motto of the Kingdom of France
 Montjoie!, a historical French cultural magazine edited by Ricciotto Canudo et al.

See also
 Montjoi (disambiguation)
 Mountjoy (disambiguation)
 Monte do Gozo

br:Montjoie
fr:Montjoi